Telle is a community council in the Maseru District of Lesotho. Its population in 2006 was 6,835.

Villages
The community of Telle includes the villages of Botsoela, Ha 'Malesia, Ha Elia, Ha Elia (Meeling), Ha Khahlana, Ha Khopolo (Lithabaneng), Ha Koloti, Ha Lechesa, Ha Leeba, Ha Lekola-Ntšo, Ha Leloko, Ha Machafela, Ha Makhele, Ha Mapitsi, Ha Mapoho, Ha Maqisha, Ha Mashenephe, Ha Masia, Ha Masienyane, Ha Monaheng, Ha Morainyane, Ha Motsu, Ha Ntsoku, Ha Nyali, Ha Pakiso, Ha Phaphaneso, Ha Popa, Ha Rakuba, Ha Ramafatsa, Ha Ramokhorong, Ha Ramosoeu, Ha Rampeo, Ha Rateele, Ha Salemone, Ha Samuel, Ha Sechache, Ha Seleke, Ha Setoi, Ha Talimo, Ha Telekoa, Ha Thiba-tsane, Ha Thotho, Ha Tieho, Ha Tlokotsi, Ha Tollo, Ha Tsekiso, Ha Tšoeu, Ha Tsoinyane, Khohlone, Khohlong (Makoabating), Khubetsoana, Konyana-Tšoana, Likotjaneng, Liphookoaneng, Litšoeneng, Matebeleng, Matsatseng, Mokotjana, Moreneng, Motlaputseng, Motse-Mocha, Nchela-Nchela, Pheselema, Polateng, Pontšeng, Sekhutlong, Sekoting, Tebeleng, Thabeng, Tholang, Thoteng, Tiping, Tša-Lebe and Tšutsulupa.

References

External links
 Google map of community villages

Populated places in Maseru District